Matthew Thomas Beaty (born April 28, 1993) is an American professional baseball first baseman and left fielder in the Kansas City Royals organization. He has previously played in Major League Baseball (MLB) for the Los Angeles Dodgers and San Diego Padres. He played college baseball for the Belmont Bruins. The Dodgers selected Beaty in the 12th round of the 2015 MLB draft, and he made his MLB debut in 2019.

Amateur career
Beaty attended Dresden High School in Dresden, Tennessee. The Kansas City Royals selected him in the 48th round of the 2011 MLB draft, but he did not sign. Beaty attended Belmont University and played college baseball for the Belmont Bruins.

Professional career

Los Angeles Dodgers

The Los Angeles Dodgers selected Beaty in the 12th round of the 2015 Major League Baseball draft and he signed with them and spent 2015 with both the Ogden Raptors and Great Lakes Loons, posting a combined .314 batting average with four home runs and 28 runs batted in (RBIs) in 68 total games between both clubs. He spent 2016 with the Rancho Cucamonga Quakes, compiling a .297 batting average with 11 home runs and 88 RBIs in 124 games, and 2017 with the Tulsa Drillers where he slashed .326/.378/.505 with 15 home runs and 69 RBIs in 116 games, earning him league player of the year honors. He also won the league batting title. He was assigned to play in the Arizona Fall League and was chosen for the Fall Stars Game showcase. Beaty played for the Oklahoma City Dodgers of the Class AAA Pacific Coast League in 2018, batting .277 with one home run and 12 RBIs in 31 games.

The Dodgers added him to their 40-man roster after the 2018 season. He began 2019 with Oklahoma City, and was promoted him to the major leagues on April 30. He made his MLB debut that night against the San Francisco Giants, singling off of Ty Blach. His first MLB homer was off of Kyle Hendricks of the Chicago Cubs on June 14. He hit a walk-off homer against the Colorado Rockies on June 21. He appeared in 99 games for the Dodgers in 2019, with 35 games each in the outfield and at first base and nine games at third base. He hit .265/.317/.458 with nine homers and 46 RBIs.

In the pandemic-shortened 2020 season, Beaty played 13 games at first base for the Dodgers, in addition to two in left field and five as the designated hitter. He hit .220/.278/.360 in 50 at bats, with two homers and five RBIs. He was optioned to the Dodgers alternate training site on September 11, and remained there for the rest of the regular season. He did rejoin the Dodgers roster for the postseason, but only appeared in two games in the 2020 NLCS and did not record a hit in three at-bats. Beaty hit his first career grand slam off of Alec Bettinger of the Milwaukee Brewers on May 2, 2021.

Beaty played in 120 games for the Dodgers in 2021, primarily as a pinch hitter, and had a .270 batting average with seven home runs and 40 RBIs. He appeared in nine games for the Dodgers in the playoffs, getting 11 at-bats and recording only one hit. He was designated for assignment by the Dodgers on March 23, 2022.

San Diego Padres
On March 28, 2022, Beaty was traded to the San Diego Padres in exchange for River Ryan. Beaty batted 4-for-43 (.093). On September 10, Beaty was designated for assignment. He declined his assignment to Triple-A and became a free agent on September 14.

Kansas City Royals
On January 10, 2023, Beaty signed a minor league contract with the Kansas City Royals organization.

Personal life 
Beaty was born to David Beaty and Lynn Beaty. He has an older sister, Jennifer, and a younger brother, Kyle. Beaty married his high school sweetheart, Jesica Parsley Beaty, in 2016.  He asked her to marry him by presenting her with a custom-made bobblehead in the image of Beaty proposing to Parsley.

Beaty and his wife began the Matt Beaty Fund for Weakley County student-athletes going to play at the next level, and the funds will also be used to help the sports programs in the county.

References

External links

1993 births
Living people
People from Snellville, Georgia
Sportspeople from the Atlanta metropolitan area
Baseball players from Georgia (U.S. state)
Major League Baseball third basemen
Major League Baseball first basemen
Major League Baseball outfielders
Los Angeles Dodgers players
San Diego Padres players
Belmont Bruins baseball players
Ogden Raptors players
Great Lakes Loons players
Rancho Cucamonga Quakes players
Tulsa Drillers players
Glendale Desert Dogs players
Arizona League Dodgers players
Toros del Este players
American expatriate baseball players in the Dominican Republic
Oklahoma City Dodgers players